The 1925 Washington State Cougars football team was an American football team that represented Washington State College as a member of the Pacific Coast Conference (PCC) during the 1925 PCC football season. In its third season under head coach Albert Exendine, the team compiled a 3–4–1 record (2–3 against PCC opponents) and tied for sixth place in the PCC.

Schedule

References

Washington State
Washington State Cougars football seasons
Washington State Cougars football